Edward Strong Merrill (c. 1880 – March 29, 1951) so-named as his father chose the middle name Strong in admiration of a leader of the railroad then going through Beloit, was an American track athlete and college football player and coach. He served as the head football coach at Lawrence University (1902), Colorado College (1903) and Occidental College (1905–1906).  Merrill attended Beloit College in Wisconsin, starring in football, baseball, and track before graduating in 1902.  He died on March 29, 1951, in Los Angeles, California, at the age of 71. 

Reared on the Merrill Farm in Beloit, WI and despising chores he was so enamored of labor-saving mechanical devices - leading ultimately to a love of automobiles, that later he settled in an American capital of auto racing - Venice, CA. After tryouts in professional baseball, yet still influenced by his father, C.D. Merrill - and scion of a long line of ministers, he eschewed participation in football to become a psychiatrist. Ultimately Dr. Merrill founded and operated a sanitarium bearing his name from 1920 until his death in 1951 in Venice, CA. The property was purchased by the County of Los Angeles and is now site of a City of Los Angeles community police station, located at the intersection of Culver Blvd. and Centinela Ave. immediately south of Culver City.

References

External links
 Sports-Reference profile

1951 deaths
19th-century players of American football
Beloit Buccaneers baseball players
Beloit Buccaneers football players
Colorado College Tigers football coaches
Lawrence Vikings football coaches
Occidental Tigers football coaches
College men's track and field athletes in the United States
Year of birth uncertain